Liana Stanciu (born 24 July 1971) is a Romanian radio and television presenter. She suffers from dysphonia, which gives her voice a special stamp that has contributed to her celebrity status.

She is married to Mihai Georgescu, the lead singer of the band Bere Gratis and together they have a daughter, Teodora, born on 7 December 2005.

References

Romanian television presenters
Romanian radio presenters
Romanian journalists
Romanian women journalists
Romanian women television presenters
Romanian women radio presenters
1971 births
Living people